Dębowiec  is a village in the administrative district of Gmina Prudnik, within Prudnik County, Opole Voivodeship, in south-western Poland, close to the Czech border.

The village has a population of 40.

Monuments 
The following monuments are listed by the Narodowy Instytut Dziedzictwa.

 kaplica, z XIX w.
 Chapel from the 19th century
 kaplica przydrożna, z XIX w.
 Chapel from the 19th century, close to Wieszczyna

References

Villages in Prudnik County